The Premio Bancarella is an Italian literary prize established in 1953; it is given in Pontremoli every year, the last Saturday or the last Sunday in July.

At first, six books are selected and award the Premio Selezione Bancarella, then the booksellers establish the winner with their vote. The awarding of the prize take place in the last evening.

At present, Premio Bancarella is at the 54th edition.

List of winners

Premio Bancarella della Cucina
The Premio Bancarella della Cucina, inaugurated in 2006, is awarded by the Fondazione Città del Libro together with the Accademia Italiana della Cucina and is intended to promote the gastronomic traditions and heritage of Italy.,

Other prizes
Other prizes assigned in Pontremoli together with Bancarella are: Premio Bancarellino and Premio Bancarella Sport.

Notes

External links
Premio Bancarella 

 
Bancarella
Awards established in 1953
1953 establishments in Italy